William G. Moseley served in the Massachusetts House of Representatives in the early 1900s. He was from Needham, Massachusetts.

References

Politicians from Needham, Massachusetts
Members of the Massachusetts House of Representatives
Year of birth missing
Year of death missing